Monon Commercial Historic District is a national historic district located at Monon, White County, Indiana.  The district encompasses 24 contributing buildings in the central business district of Monon.  It developed between about 1860 and 1940 and includes representative examples of Italianate and Classical Revival style architecture. Notable contributing resources include the C.M. Horner's Bank (c. 1870, 1921), Monon Town Hall (c. 1920), Carnegie Library, Howard Theater (1938), Pogue Building (c. 1895), Fred Thomas Building (1912), Tull Block (1921), James Tull / J. Lackerman Building (c. 1895), Newbold Oldsmobile Building (c. 1910), State Bank of Monon (1912), and Odd Fellows Building (1911).

It was listed on the National Register of Historic Places in 2000.

References

Historic districts on the National Register of Historic Places in Indiana
Italianate architecture in Indiana
Neoclassical architecture in Indiana
Buildings and structures in White County, Indiana
National Register of Historic Places in White County, Indiana